Pellaea glabella is the smooth cliffbrake.  For much of pteridological history, it was regarded as a reduced form or variety of Pellaea atropurpurea.  P. glabella is known to exist in two cryptic species, one diploid and one tetraploid.  The diploid reproduces sexually, while the tetraploid is normally apogamous. It is now known that the tetraploid form of the species is one of the parents of the original hybrid P. × atropurpurea that became the apogamous species.

P. glabella is epipetric, normally growing on well-weathered limestone. It favors more exposed sites than P. atropurpurea.

This species is distinguished by its sessile or nearly sessile pinnae and smooth, not hairy, stipes.

P. glabella has been assigned a total of four subspecies:
 Pellaea glabella subsp. glabella Mettenius ex Kuhn
 Pellaea glabella subsp. missouriensis (G. J. Gastony) Windham
 Pellaea glabella subsp. occidentalis (E. E. Nelson) Windham
 Pellaea glabella subsp. simplex (Butters) A. Löve & D. Löve

The subspecies glabella and simplex are the tetraploids, while missouriensis and occidentalis are the diploids.  Glabella and missouriensis have hairlike scales near the midrib, while simplex and occidentalis are completely glabrous.

References
P. glabella USDA Plants Profile: http://plants.usda.gov/java/profile?symbol=PEGL
P. glabella in Flora of North America: http://www.efloras.org/florataxon.aspx?flora_id=1&taxon_id=233500875

glabella
Ferns of the United States
Flora of the Southwestern United States
Flora of the Eastern United States
Flora of the Great Lakes region (North America)
Flora of the United States
Flora of the Northern United States
Flora of the North-Central United States
Flora of the Appalachian Mountains
Flora of Canada